Rebergues is a commune in the Pas-de-Calais department in the Hauts-de-France region of France.

Geography
Rebergues lies about 12 miles (19 km) west of Saint-Omer, on the D216E road.

Population

Places of interest
 The eighteenth century church.
 The Château du Rougefort, dating from the eighteenth century.

See also
Communes of the Pas-de-Calais department

References

Communes of Pas-de-Calais